Thorley Street is a village on the Isle of Wight. it is located four kilometres from Totland in the northwest of the island. It is in the civil parish of Shalfleet.

Villages on the Isle of Wight